Anthony Bedford Steel  (24 February 1900 – 3 October 1973) was a British historian, specialising in medieval England. He was a fellow of Christ's College, Cambridge, and principal of Cardiff University from 1949 to 1966. Among his publications were a monograph on the reign of Richard II, as well as a biography of the 19th-century writer Robert Smith Surtees, titled Jorrick's England. He also translated Albert Sorel's L'Europe et la Revolution Francaise into English (as Europe and the French Revolution).

Publications
Jorrocks's England: On the Works of Robert Smith Surtees (London: Methuen & Co., 1932).
Richard II (Cambridge: Cambridge University Press, 1941).
The Custom of the Room; or, Early Wine-Books of Christ's College, Cambridge (Cambridge: W. Heffer & Sons 1951).
The Receipt of the Exchequer, 1377–1485 (Cambridge: Cambridge University Press, 1954).

References

1900 births
1973 deaths
20th-century biographers
20th-century British historians
Academics of Cardiff University
British biographers
British male non-fiction writers
British medievalists
Commanders of the Order of St John
Commanders of the Order of the British Empire
Fellows of Christ's College, Cambridge
Historians of England
Male biographers